John Richard Schlesinger  (16 February 1926 – 25 July 2003) was an English film and stage director. He won the Academy Award for Best Director for Midnight Cowboy, and was nominated for the same award for two other films (Darling and Sunday Bloody Sunday).

Early life
Schlesinger was born and raised in Hampstead, London, in a Jewish family, the eldest of five children of distinguished Emmanuel College, Cambridge-educated paediatrician and physician Bernard Edward Schlesinger (1896–1984), OBE, FRCP, who had also served in the Royal Army Medical Corps as a brigadier, and his wife Winifred Henrietta, daughter of Hermann Regensburg, a stockbroker from Frankfurt. She had left school at 14 to study at the Trinity College of Music, and later studied languages at the University of Oxford for three years. Bernard Schlesinger's father Richard, a stockbroker, had come to England in the 1880s from Frankfurt.

After St Edmund's School, Hindhead and Uppingham School (where his father had also been), Schlesinger enlisted in the British Army during World War II. While serving with the Royal Engineers, he made films on the war's front line. He also entertained his fellow troops by performing magic tricks. After his tour of duty, he continued making short films and acted in stage productions while studying at Balliol College, Oxford, where he was involved in the Oxford University Dramatic Society.

Career
Schlesinger's acting career began in the 1950s and consisted of supporting roles in British films such as The Divided Heart and Oh... Rosalinda!!, and British television productions such as BBC Sunday Night Theatre, The Adventures of Robin Hood and The Vise. He began his directorial career in 1956 with the short documentary Sunday in the Park about London's Hyde Park. In 1958, Schlesinger created a documentary on Benjamin Britten and the Aldeburgh Festival for the BBC's Monitor TV programme, including rehearsals of the children's opera Noye's Fludde featuring a young Michael Crawford. In 1959, Schlesinger was credited as exterior or second unit director on 23 episodes of the TV series The Four Just Men and four 30-minute episodes of the series Danger Man. He also appeared in Col March of Scotland Yard as "Dutch cook" in "Death and the Other Monkey" 1956.

By the 1960s, he had virtually given up acting to concentrate on a directing career, and another of his earlier directorial efforts, the British Transport Films' documentary Terminus (1961), gained a Venice Film Festival Gold Lion and a British Academy Award. His first two fiction films, A Kind of Loving (1962) and Billy Liar (1963) were set in the North of England. A Kind of Loving won the Golden Bear award at the 12th Berlin International Film Festival in 1962. His third feature film, Darling (1965), tartly described the modern way of life in London and was one of the first films about 'swinging London'. Schlesinger's next film was the period drama Far from the Madding Crowd (1967), an adaptation of Thomas Hardy's popular novel accentuated by beautiful English country locations. Both films (and Billy Liar) featured Julie Christie as the female lead.

Schlesinger's next film, Midnight Cowboy (1969), was internationally acclaimed. A story of two hustlers living on the fringe in the bad side of New York City, it was Schlesinger's first film shot in the US, and it won Oscars for Best Director and Best Picture. During the 1970s, he made an array of films that were mainly about loners, losers and people outside the mainstream world, such as Sunday Bloody Sunday (1971), The Day of the Locust (1975), Marathon Man (1976) and Yanks (1979). Later, came the major box office and critical failure of Honky Tonk Freeway (1981), followed by films that attracted mixed responses from the public, and low returns, although The Falcon and the Snowman (1985) made money and Pacific Heights (1990) was a box-office hit. In Britain, he did better with films like Madame Sousatzka (1988) and Cold Comfort Farm (1995). Other later works include plays for television An Englishman Abroad (1983) and A Question of Attribution (1991), both with scripts by Alan Bennett, The Innocent (1993) and The Next Best Thing (2000).

Schlesinger directed on stage Timon of Athens (1965) for the Royal Shakespeare Company and the musical I and Albert (1972) at London's Piccadilly Theatre. From 1973, he was an associate director of the Royal National Theatre, where he produced George Bernard Shaw's Heartbreak House (1975). He directed several operas, including Les contes d'Hoffmann (1980) and Der Rosenkavalier (1984), both at Covent Garden. 

Schlesinger directed a party political broadcast for the Conservative Party in the general election of 1992, which featured Prime Minister John Major returning to Brixton in south London, thus highlighting Major's humble background, something atypical for a Conservative politician at that time. Schlesinger admitted to having voted for all three main political parties in the UK at one time or another.

Later life
In 1991, Schlesinger made a brief return to acting, portraying the gay character 'Derek' in the TV adaptation of The Lost Language of Cranes for the BBC. Schlesinger had himself come out during the making of Midnight Cowboy.

Schlesinger was appointed Commander of the Order of the British Empire (CBE) in the 1970 Birthday Honours for services to film. Maintaining a flat in London and house at Palm Springs, California Schlesinger had a Golden Palm Star on the Palm Springs Walk of Stars dedicated to him in 2003.

Schlesinger underwent a quadruple heart bypass in 1998, before suffering a stroke on New Year's Day 2001. He was taken off life support at Desert Regional Medical Center in Palm Springs on 24 July 2003, and he died early the following day at the age of 77. 

He was survived by his partner of over 30 years, photographer Michael Childers. A memorial service was held on 30 September 2003.

Awards and nominations
Academy Awards
 Best Director (1966) (Darling) – Nominated
 Best Director (1970) (Midnight Cowboy) – Won
 Best Director (1972) (Sunday Bloody Sunday) – Nominated
BAFTA Awards
 Best Short Film (1962) (Terminus) – Won
 Best British Film (1966) (Darling) – Nominated
 Best Direction (1970) (Midnight Cowboy) – Won
 Best Direction (1972) (Sunday Bloody Sunday) – Won
 Best Direction (1980) (Yanks) – Nominated
 Best Single Drama (1984) (An Englishman Abroad) – Won
 Best Single Drama (1992) (A Question of Attribution) – Won
 BAFTA Fellowship (1996)
Golden Globe Awards
 Best Director (1966) (Darling) – Nominated
 Best Director (1970) (Midnight Cowboy) – Nominated
 Best Director (1977) (Marathon Man) – Nominated

Filmography

Feature films

 A Kind of Loving (1962)
 Billy Liar (1963)
 Darling (1965)
 Far From the Madding Crowd (1967)
 Midnight Cowboy (1969)
 Sunday Bloody Sunday (1971)
 The Day of the Locust (1975)
 Marathon Man (1976)
 Yanks (1979)
 Honky Tonk Freeway (1981)
 The Falcon and the Snowman (1985)
 The Believers (1987)
 Madame Sousatzka (1988)
 Pacific Heights (1990)
 The Innocent (1993)
 Cold Comfort Farm (1995)
 Eye for an Eye (1996)
 The Next Best Thing (2000)

Television films
 Separate Tables (1983) (TV)
 An Englishman Abroad (1983) (TV)
 A Question of Attribution (1991) (TV)
 Cold Comfort Farm (1995) (TV)
 The Tale of Sweeney Todd (1998) (TV)

Documentary films
 Sunday in the Park (1956)
 Terminus (1961)
 Israel: A Right to Live (1967)
 Visions of Eight (segment, The Longest) (1973)

References

Sources
 Mann, William .J (2004). Edge of Midnight: The Life of John Schlesinger. London: Hutchinson.

External links

 
 
 
 Senses of Cinema: Great Directors Critical Database
 Literature on John Schlesinger
 Interview at the British Entertainment History Project

1926 births
2003 deaths
20th-century LGBT people
Alumni of Balliol College, Oxford
BAFTA fellows
Best Directing Academy Award winners
Best Director BAFTA Award winners
British Army personnel of World War II
Commanders of the Order of the British Empire
David di Donatello winners
Directors Guild of America Award winners
Directors of Golden Bear winners
English expatriates in the United States
English film directors
English Jews
LGBT film directors
LGBT Jews
English LGBT people
LGBT theatre directors
Male actors from London
Male actors from Palm Springs, California
People educated at St Edmund's School, Hindhead
People educated at Uppingham School
Royal Engineers soldiers